The Conseil scolaire de district catholique des Aurores boréales oversees 10 French language Catholic schools in Thunder Bay District, Ontario, Canada.  It administers education at nine elementary schools, and one secondary school.

Elementary schools 
École catholique Franco-Supérieur (Thunder Bay)
École catholique des Étoiles-du-Nord (Red Lake, Ontario)
École catholique de l'Enfant-Jésus (Dryden)
École Immaculée-Conception (Ignace)
École catholique Franco-Terrace (Terrace Bay)
École catholique Val-des-Bois (Marathon)
École Notre-Dame-de-Fatima (Longlac)
École St-Joseph (Geraldton)
Notre Dame des Écoles (Nakina)

Secondary schools 
École secondaire catholique de la Vérendrye (Thunder Bay)

See also 

Education in Thunder Bay, Ontario
Lakehead District School Board
Thunder Bay Catholic District School Board
List of school districts in Ontario
List of high schools in Ontario

References

External links 
Conseil scolaire de district catholique des Aurores boréales 

French-language school districts in Ontario
Roman Catholic school districts in Ontario
Conseil
Conseil